Fever FM is an FM radio station in India. It is currently available in 13 cities in India:

Music & Bollywood 
Fever plays contemporary hit music in Delhi, Mumbai and Chennai, while the other cities have a mix of contemporary and retro Bollywood music. There are differentiating packages too through which music is played, like 40 mins non-stop music, Fever Unplugged, Fever Ka Thappa (Fever certification on the biggest songs), Teen Gaane Back to Back, Fever Top 10 and Fever Super Fresh. In 2016 and 2017, Fever FM had the maximum number of song exclusives in the industry, where a song breaks first on Fever FM for a few days and then on other Radio channels. Fever FM has also been the official movie partner for the biggest movies in Bollywood, like Jab Harry Met Sejal, Dangal, Tiger Zinda Hai, Padmaavat, Badrinath Ki Dulhania, Dilwale and Tamasha.

Sports Alliances 
Fever FM is credited with the maximum sports alliances in the industry.  In the Indian Premier League, it has been the official Radio Partner of Delhi Daredevils for 11 years, with Kolkata Knight Riders for 8 years and with Mumbai Indians and Royal Challengers Bangalore for 7 years. In Indian Super League, Fever FM has been the official Radio partner for ATK (Atletico De Kolkata). Fever FM has been the official radio partner of Formula One and Indian Hockey League, while also partnering with Baahubali Boxers in the Super Boxing League.

Areas of operation 
Unless specified, all stations are on 104.0 MHz

 Delhi
 Mumbai, MH
 Bengaluru, KA
 Kolkata, WB
 Chennai, TN (broadcast on 91.9 MHz)
 Hyderabad, TS (broadcast on 94.3 MHz)
 Lucknow, UP 
 Kanpur, UP (broadcast on 95.0 MHz)
 Agra, UP (broadcast on 93.7 MHz)
 Aligarh, UP (broadcast on 94.9 MHz)
 Prayagraj, UP (broadcast on 94.3 MHz)
 Ayodhya, UP (broadcast on 94.3 MHz)
 Gorakhpur, UP (as Fever 94.3 FM)
 Bareilly, UP (Broadcast on 94.9 MHz)

References

External links
 Fever FM official site

Radio stations in Delhi
Radio stations in Mumbai
Radio stations in Kolkata
Virgin Radio
Hindustan Times
Year of establishment missing